Blood Death Ivory is the second studio album by Australian electro-industrial band Angelspit. Work on Blood Death Ivory started in October 2006. The groundwork was done from April to November 2007, but the main focused work on the album happened from December 2007 to February 2008.

On 15 May 2009, a remix album of Blood Death Ivory entitled Black Kingdom Red Kingdom was released featuring remixes by artists such as KMFDM, Ayria, I:Scintilla, Baal and Ego Likeness.

Track listing

External links
Blood Death Ivory at Angelspit.net
Blood Death Ivory overview by ZooG at Angelspit.net

2008 albums
Angelspit albums